Narbéfontaine (Lorraine Franconian Memerschbronn) is a commune in the Moselle department in Grand Est in north-eastern France.

List of mayors
 Jean Muller (1988 - March 2001)
 Marie-Paule Dolle (March 2001 - March 2008)
 Christiane Muller (March 2008 - )

Population history

See also
 Communes of the Moselle department

References

External links
 

Communes of Moselle (department)